A Strange Arrangement is the debut studio album by American musician Mayer Hawthorne. The album was released on September 8, 2009, by Stones Throw Records. The album debuted at number 147 on the Billboard 200 chart, in the first week of its release.

Track listing

Charts

References

Mayer Hawthorne albums
2009 debut albums
Stones Throw Records albums